This is the complete list of Pan American Games medalists in rowing from 1951 to 2019.

Event

Men's single sculls

Men's double sculls

Men's quadruple sculls

Men's coxless pair

Men's coxed pair

Men's coxless four

Men's coxed four

Men's eight

Men's lightweight singles sculls

Men's lightweight double sculls

Men's lightweight quadruple sculls

Men's lightweight coxless pairs

Men's lightweight coxless four

Men's lightweight eights

Women's single sculls

Women's double sculls

Women's quadruple sculls

Women's coxless pair

Women's coxless four

Women's lightweight single sculls

Women's lightweight double sculls

Women's lightweight coxless pair

Women's lightweight quadruple sculls

References

External links
Pan American Games results at bestsports.com.br

Rowing
Pan American Games medalists